Fjellestad is a surname. Notable people with the surname include:

 Danuta Fjellestad (born 1952), Swedish professor of American Literary studies
 Hans Fjellestad (born 1968), American pianist, music composer and documentary filmmaker
 Torill Fjellestad (born 1982), Norwegian footballer